The 2022–23 Coupe de France preliminary rounds, Pays de la Loire is the qualifying competition to decide which teams from the leagues of the Pays de la Loire region of France take part in the main competition from the seventh round.

A total of eleven teams will qualify from the Pays de la Loire preliminary rounds.

In 2021–22, La Roche VF progressed furthest in the main competition, reaching the round of 32, where they lost to eventual semi-finalists FC Versailles 78.

Draws and fixtures
On 19 July 2022, the league confirmed 522 teams had entered the competition. On 21 July 2022 the draw for the first round was published, with 221 matches featuring teams from Régional 3 and the district sides, with just two Régional 3 sides receiving byes to the second round.

The second round draw was published on 30 August 2022, with 41 teams (from Régional 2 and the exempted Régional 3 sides) entering.

The third round draw was made on 7 September 2022, with 19 teams from Régional 1 and 12 from Championnat National 3 joining the 131 qualifiers from the second round, for a total of 81 fixtures.

The fourth round draw was made live on the leagues official Facebook page on 14 September 2022. The three teams from Championnat National 2 joined the competition at this stage.

The fifth round draw took place on 29 September 2022, with the two teams from Championnat National joining the competition at this stage. The sixth round draw took place in an Intermarché shop in La Roche-sur-Yon on 11 October 2022.

First round
These matches were played on 27 and 28 August 2022.

Second round
These matches were played on 4 September 2022.

Third round
These matches were played on 10 and 11 September 2022.

Fourth round
These matches were played on 24 and 24 September 2022.

Fifth round
These matches were played on 8 and 9 October 2022.

Sixth round
These matches were played on 16 October 2022.

References

Preliminary rounds